Kolo may refer to:

Places

Poland
Koło
Koło, Łódź Voivodeship
Koło, Lublin Voivodeship
Koło, Lubusz Voivodeship

Other places
Kolo, Bosnia and Herzegovina
Kolo, Central African Republic
Kolo (Tanzanian ward), Kondoa district, Dodoma Region, Tanzania

Kolo, Togo
Kolo Volost

People
Kolo Touré, Ivorian footballer
Roger Kolo, Prime Minister of Madagascar
Ibrahim Adamu Kolo, Lecturer

Other
Kolo (bread), Ethiopian small bread
Kolo (dance), southern Slavic circle dance
Kolo (magazine), Croatian literary quarterly
Kolo (album), by the rock band Van Gogh
KOLO-TV, television station in Reno, Nevada
Ensemble "Kolo"

See also
Kolos (disambiguation)